Negrin is a surname; notable people with this surname include:

Francisco Negrin (born 1963), Mexican-born opera director
Hayley Faith Negrin (born 2003), American child actress
John Negrin (born 1989), Canadian ice hockey player
Juan Negrín (1892–1956), Spanish politician
Rosa Elena Simeón Negrín, Cuban politician

See also: 

Spanish-language surnames